St Ives is a rural locality in the Adelaide Hills of South Australia.

St Ives spans a section of the South Eastern Freeway between Mount Barker and Callington. There is an unsealed road under the freeway linking the two sides, but no access on or off of the freeway in St Ives.

References

Towns in South Australia